The  doubles Tournament at the 2007 Commonwealth Bank Tennis Classic took place between 10 and 16 December on outdoor hard courts in Bali, Indonesia. Ji Chunmei and Sun Shengnan won the title, defeating Jill Craybas and Natalie Grandin in the final.

Seeds

Draw

References

2007 Doubles
Commonwealth Bank Tennis Classic - Doubles